Marcelaria is a genus of crustose lichens in the family Trypetheliaceae. It has three species. The genus was circumscribed in 2013 by André Aptroot, Matthew P. Nelsen, and Sittiporn Parnmen, with Marcelaria purpurina assigned as the type species. The genus contains species that were previously in the Laurera purpurina species group. Species in Marcelaria contain secondary compounds such as red, orange, and yellow anthraquinones, and sometimes lichexanthone. The genus name honours Brazilian lichenologist Marcela Cáceres.

Species
Marcelaria benguelensis  – continental southeast Asia
Marcelaria cumingii  – southeast Asia
Marcelaria purpurina  – neotropics; tropical West Africa

References

Trypetheliaceae
Dothideomycetes genera
Taxa described in 2013
Taxa named by André Aptroot